Countess Anne of Nassau-Siegen (1440 or 1441 – 5 or 8 April 1514), official titles: Gräfin zu Nassau, Vianden und Diez, Frau zu Breda, was a countess from the House of Nassau-Siegen, a cadet branch of the Ottonian Line of the House of Nassau, and through marriage successively Duchess of Brunswick-Lüneburg and Countess of Katzenelnbogen. She acted as regent of the Duchy of Brunswick-Lüneburg for her son in the period 1479–1486.

Biography
It is not known where and when Anne was born, some reasons suggest that she was born at the end of 1440 or 1441. She was the eldest daughter of Count John IV of Nassau-Siegen and his wife Lady Mary of Looz-Heinsberg.

Anne married on 28 October 1467 to Duke Otto II ‘the Victorious’ of Brunswick-Lüneburg (1439 – January 1471), who had succeeded his brother Duke Bernard II in 1464. Anne already became a widow in January 1471. Her son Henry succeeded his father. As Henry was still a minor, he was under the custody and regency of his paternal grandfather Duke Frederick II ‘the Pious’, who had been in a monastery since 1457. Anne had her dower  rebuild between 1471 and 1473.

Anne remarried on 24 January 1474 to Count Philip ‘the Elder’ of Katzenelnbogen (1402 – 28 July 1479). Philip had previously married on 24 February 1422 to Countess Anne of Württemberg (d. 16 April 1471). From his first marriage Philip had three children. The eldest son, Philip ‘the Younger’, had married Anne’s first cousin Ottilie of Nassau-Siegen, but died already in 1453. The second son Eberhard died three years later. Finally there was a daughter, Anne, who was married to Landgrave Henry III ‘the Rich’ of Hesse-Marburg.

Anne’s second marriage was arranged by Anne’s parents with the cooperation of the estates of the realm of the County of Katzenelnbogen. If a son had been born from the marriage between the 72 years old Philip and the 32 years old Anne, the later seizure of the County of Katzenelnbogen by the Landgraviate of Hesse, which had its legal basis in the marriage of Philip’s daughter Anne to Henry III of Hesse-Marburg, could have been avoided. This would have been entirely in the interest of the Counts of Nassau. The marriage contract stipulated that Anne should receive an annual income of 1600 guilders in interest and in kind as a dower. Philip assigned Burgschwalbach to his bride as her dower residence, together with the associated lordship and all rights of use; income derived from these lordship rights, for example from court fines and other fees, was not to be deducted from her other income. As a morning gift, Philip obligated himself to allocate her 200 guilders annually, which Anne was allowed to use as she saw fit after his death, for example for the salvation of her soul. In return, Anne was to bring an annual dowry of 400 guilders into the marriage. This dowry consisted of the income from her dower in the Duchy of Brunswick-Lüneburg, the District of Lüchow, which she leased for a sum of 666 guilders annually. For the first time, a firm will on the part of Anne becomes perceptible: as her father-in-law Duke Frederick ‘the Pious’ and his councillors objected to the lessee she had chosen because they were at feud with him, Anne did not bow to the duke’s wishes, but prevailed with regard to the lease agreement. When she left Celle and the Duchy of Brunswick-Lüneburg at the end of 1473, Anne left her five-year-old son in the care of her father-in-law and sister-in-law Magaret as the only female relative. This was customary and even legally binding for the children of a princely widow from her first marriage. After all, Henry was the sole heir to the duchy. What feelings moved Anne in this is unknown, and how the young duke experienced the departure of his mother, is also unknown.

Soon after her marriage to Philip, Anne became the pawn in her father’s political intrigue. An attempt was made to poison her. A priest accused of multiple murders, Johann von Börnich, confessed that, at the instigation of close confidants of the Landgrave of Hesse, he had given her a goblet of poisoned wine at a service he celebrated in the chapel of Rheinfels Castle in Katzenelnbogen in January 1474, allegedly before the marriage. After she had drunk some of the wine, Anne fell ill; apparently she had been poisoned. All that is certain, however, is that she suffered from a fever and recovered quickly. The attending physician did not find any signs of poisoning. During the interrogation on the rack, Johann von Börnich accused Hans von Dörnberg, the Hofmeister of the Landgrave of Hesse, in particular. The Landgraviate of Hesse would inherit the County of Katzenelnbogen, and thus would benefit from Philip’s heirless death and an untimely death of Anne. Because Anne’s father instituted criminal proceedings against von Börnich, Hesse’s reputation was dealt a heavy blow as an alleged instigator of murder.

After Philip’s death in 1479, Anne moved to her dower in Burgschwalbach and in the same year to Lüneburg and Celle. As her father-in-law Duke Frederick ‘the Pious’ had died in 1478, Anne took over custody and regency for her son Henry, with the participation of secular and ecclesiastical councillors and the town council of the city of Lüneburg, in a wise and prudent manner. During her regency (1479–1486) Anne was able to reduce the duchy’s debts and establish a sound financial administration. After her regency ended in 1486, Anne lived in her town house in Celle, and for a time also in her dower Lüchow Castle, but she also kept in touch with her old homeland and often stayed in Dillenburg or at the spa in Bad Ems.

A close relationship existed between Anne in Celle and her youngest brother Count John V. Based on the lively correspondence between them, it is even possible to reconstruct a trade exchange between the Duchy of Brunswick-Lüneburg and the County of Nassau-Siegen. In any case, Anne regularly sent her relatives in Siegen and Dillenburg fresh or smoked salmon, eels and other North Sea delicacies such as salted sturgeon and plaice, while John sent his sister cast iron pans from Siegen in return. An account from 1487 shows that on 13 July she was in Siegen, together with her brother John, to supervise the progress of the building activities of the Franciscan monastery he had founded there.

Anne died in Celle on 5 or 8 April 1514, and was buried there.

Issue
From the marriage of Anne and Otto the following children were born:
 Duke Henry ‘the Middle’ (15 September 1468 – Wienhausen, 19 February 1532). He married:
 in Celle on 27 February 1487 to Princess Margaret of Saxony (Meissen, 4 August 1469 – Weimar, 7 December 1528).
 around 1528 to Anna von Campe.
 William (? – 1480).

The marriage of Anne and Philip remained childless.

Ancestors

Literature

Notes

References

Sources
 
 
 
 
 
 
 
 
 
 
 
 
 
  (1882). Het vorstenhuis Oranje-Nassau. Van de vroegste tijden tot heden (in Dutch). Leiden: A.W. Sijthoff/Utrecht: J.L. Beijers.

External links

 Anna, die letzte Gräfin von Katzenelnbogen, by Brigitte Streich (in German).
 Brunswick. In: Medieval Lands. A prosopography of medieval European noble and royal families, by Charles Cawley.
 Die Grafen von Katzenelnbogen, by Stefan Grathoff (in German). In: regionalgeschichte.net (in German).
 Katzenelnbogen, Anna Gräfin von (in German). In: Landesgeschichtliches Informationssystem Hessen (LAGIS) (in German).
 Nassau. In: Medieval Lands. A prosopography of medieval European noble and royal families, by Charles Cawley.
 Nassau Part 4. In: An Online Gotha, by Paul Theroff.
 Welf Part 4. In: An Online Gotha, by Paul Theroff.

|-

|-

|-

1514 deaths
Anne of Nassau-Siegen
Duchesses of Brunswick-Lüneburg
German female regents
Anne of Nassau-Siegen
∞|Anne of Nassau-Siegen
15th-century German women
16th-century German women
Year of birth unknown
15th-century women rulers